David Lance Goines (May 29, 1945 – February 19, 2023), was an American artist, calligrapher, printmaker, typographer, printing entrepreneur, and author. He was born in Grants Pass, Oregon, the oldest of eight children. His father was a civil engineer and his mother a calligrapher and artist.

Biography 
David Lance Goines was born May 29, 1945, in Grants Pass, Oregon. He was the eldest of eight children and they were raised in Fresno, Sacramento, and Oakland. He attended Castlemont High School in Oakland.

During the 1960s, Goines enrolled at the University of California at Berkeley as a Classics major. While at the University of California, Berkeley he participated in the Free Speech Movement of late 1964, which led to his expulsion. Though soon re-admitted, he graduated the University in 1965, and apprenticed as a printer in Berkeley. In 1968, he founded Saint Hieronymus Press there. The major output of the press consists of Goines' limited edition poster and calendar art.

Goines art style has been described as "minimalist". In 1982, Goines published the calligraphic classic A Constructed Roman Alphabet, which won him the 1983 American Book Award. Several books collecting his poster art have been published as well. Goines art and posters can be found in international museum collections, including the Achenbach Foundation for the Graphic Arts, Fine Arts Museums of San Francisco, Cooper-Hewitt Museum, Smithsonian American Art Museum, Hiroshima City Museum of Contemporary Art, Metropolitan Museum of Art, Museum of Modern Art, Musee de la Publicite, Oakland Museum of California, Philadelphia Museum of Art, and Rochester Institute of Technology.

In addition to his artistic and calligraphic work, Goines was also a non-fiction author who had written about political activism. His book The Free Speech Movement: Coming of Age in the 1960s, was published in 1993.

Goines had enjoyed a friendship with the restaurateur Alice Waters since they were both teenagers. Every year Goines created a Chez Panisse anniversary poster and has illustrated many Chez Panisse cookbooks. He also designed the logotype and lettering for a number of Berkeley-based businesses, past and present, including Velo-Sport (a bicycle company) and the Scharffen Berger Chocolate Company.

A strong advocate of the voluntary blood donor system, Goines claimed to have donated a cumulative total of 20 gallons of blood so far during his life.

Goines died in Berkeley, California, on February 19, 2023, at the age of 77.

See also 
 Peter Rutledge Koch

References

External links
A visit with David Goines: Berkeley’s legendary letterpress printer and lithographer at Berkeleyside
 with David Lance Goines by Stephen McKiernan, Binghamton University Libraries Center for the Study of the 1960s, November 19, 2009  

1945 births
2023 deaths
University of California, Berkeley alumni
People from Grants Pass, Oregon
Artists from Berkeley, California
Culture of Berkeley, California
Artists from the San Francisco Bay Area
Writers from the San Francisco Bay Area
Activists from California
American printmakers